Martin Strel (born 1 October 1954), is a Slovenian long-distance swimmer, one of the most elite endurance athletes best known for swimming the entire length of various rivers. Strel holds successive Guinness World Records for swimming the Danube river, the Mississippi River, the Yangtze River, and the Amazon River. His motto is "swimming for peace, friendship and clean waters."

Swimming history 
Strel was born in the town of Mokronog, in the Slovenian region of Lower Carniola, then part of the Socialist Federal Republic of Yugoslavia. 
Strel's first two river swims were the Krka river (105 kilometres) in his homeland, in 28 hours in 1992, and the boundary Kolpa river, in 16 hours in 1993. In 2000, he swam the Danube River and achieved the world long distance swimming record in 58 days. In July 2001, he achieved one more world record —  of non-stop swimming in Danube within 84 hours and 10 minutes. He lost 40 pounds of weight.

In 2002, he swam the entire Mississippi River in 68 days. In 2003, he swam the Argentine Paraná River. On 10 June 2004, Martin started swimming down the Yangtze River (the longest river in Asia, the third longest in the world) in China. He reached Shanghai in 40 days on 30 July 2004, one day before planned.

Strel swam the Amazon River, commencing on 1 February 2007, finishing 66 days later on 7 April 2007. He had escort boats that were prepared to pour blood into the river to distract meat-eating fish such as piranhas.

In 2007, the Nile had been proposed as his next river, but Strel said, "I am not going to do the Nile. It's long but not challenging enough, it is just a small creek. The Amazon is much more mighty."

He plans to swim across Lake Arenal on 29 September 2010 as part of his visit to an environmentalist international film festival in Costa Rica. He plans to swim about 6 kilometres from shore and then back to his starting point.

In June 2011 Strel completed his Colorado River Swim challenge for the documentary Stan Lee's Superhumans More about the swim can be found at: Colorado Swim 2011.

Achievements by year:
2008: Sognefjord, Norway; Loch Ness, UK
2009: Doha, Qatar; River Thames, UK; River Cam, UK
2010: Grand Canyon, Arizona, US; Lake Mead, Nevada/Arizona, US
2011: Lake Ontario, Canada; Lake Simcoe, Canada; Lake Arenal, Costa Rica; San Juan River, Costa Rica
2012: Saguaro Lake, Arizona, US; Canyon Lake, Arizona, US; Apache Lake, Arizona, US Theodore Roosevelt Lake, Arizona, US
2013: Lake Powell, Arizona/Utah, US; Robben Island, South Africa
2014: Bondi Beach, Australia; Shelly Beach, Australia
2015: Lake Pleasant, Arizona, US; Tennessee River, Tennessee, US
2016: Rocky Point, Mexico; Alkhobar (Saudi Arabia) – Manamma (Bahrain)
2017: Manhattan, New York, US; Lake Wörth, Austria
2018: Alcatraz – Golden Gate Bridge, US
2019: Farallon Islands, California, US
2020: San Diego River, California, US
2021: Mura River, Slovenia

Big River Man 
Strel was the subject and star of a feature documentary entitled Big River Man directed by the acclaimed art-house director John Maringouin. The film, which won a Best Cinematography prize at the 2009 Sundance Film Festival, was critically praised for its blend of comedy and drama. The film chronicled Strel's 3,300 mile historic swim of the Amazon River.

Strel Swimming Adventures 
In 2010, Martin Strel and his son Borut Strel founded a company that offers swimming adventure holidays in the Mediterranean and at Lake Powell, Arizona. They currently offer swimming adventure holiday tours at Lake Powell, Arizona, in Slovenia (Lake Bled, Lake Bohinj, and the Soča River), on Croatia's Dalmatian coast swimming from island to island, in Montenegro exploring Adriatic fjords and coves, and cruising Mediterranean Turkey. Strel takes part in some trips.

Global Center for Advanced Studies 
In 2013, Martin Strel joined the faculty of The Global Center for Advanced Studies in its newly formed Institute of Adventure Studies.

References

External links
Strel's official site
The Amazon Swim Project site
Strel Swimming Adventure Holidays site
Diary of Amazon swim at BBC news

1954 births
Living people
Male long-distance swimmers
Slovenian male swimmers
People from the Municipality of Mokronog-Trebelno
20th-century Slovenian people
21st-century Slovenian people